Time of Your Life is an American teen drama television series starring Jennifer Love Hewitt that aired for one season on Fox from October 25, 1999 to June 21, 2000. A spin-off of Party of Five, the series followed Sarah Reeves Merrin as she moved to New York City to learn more about her biological parents. Co-stars included Jennifer Garner, Pauley Perrette and Gina Ravera.

Time of Your Life debuted on Fox on October 25, 1999, but was later put on an indefinite hiatus that ended up lasting five months due to low ratings. The series returned to the network in June 2000 as a part of its summer schedule, but was soon officially cancelled. As a result, the series' final seven episodes remained unaired in the United States, but were later broadcast in several European countries. GetTV aired the entire series on October 28, 2021.

Plot
The series centers on the new life of Hewitt's character Sarah Reeves Merrin as she moves to New York City to learn more about her biological mother's life there before she bore Sarah, while also searching for her biological father. Along the way, Sarah moves into her mother's old apartment and makes a new group of friends. Her first friend is her new roommate Romy Sullivan (Jennifer Garner), a struggling actress.

Cast
 Jennifer Love Hewitt as Sarah Reeves Merrin
 Jennifer Garner as Romy Sullivan
 Pauley Perrette as Cecilia Wiznarski
 Gina Ravera as Jocelyn "Joss" House
 Johnathon Schaech as John Maguire
 Diego Serrano as Jesse Byron "J.B." Castel

Debut and cancellation

Time of Your Life first aired on October 25, 1999; it was canceled in the middle of its first season (following a five-month hiatus), on June 21, 2000. Despite Hewitt's popularity at the time, the show was not well received and had poor ratings. The original pilot for the show was completely re-shot and largely rewritten before Fox would air it.

Fox tried to save the show by putting it on a hiatus that lasted five months. Fox promoted the return of the show in June 2000 as part of its "Summer of Love," a reference to Hewitt's name. However, despite the promotion, ratings for the series' return episode remained low, and it was immediately canceled, with seven episodes remaining unaired in the United States; they were later broadcast in several European countries.

The entire series aired on October 28, 2021 on getTV.

Episodes
All episode titles begin with the phrase "The Time..."

Reception
On Rotten Tomatoes the series has an approval rating of 45% based on reviews from 11 critics.

References

External links
 

1990s American teen drama television series
1999 American television series debuts
2000s American teen drama television series
2006 American television series endings
American television spin-offs
English-language television shows
Fox Broadcasting Company original programming
Television series by Sony Pictures Television
Television shows set in New York City
Television shows filmed in Los Angeles